The Attorney-General is a political and legal officer in Fiji. The attorney-general is the chief law officer of the State, and has responsibility for supervising Fijian law and advising the government on legal matters. Like other members of the Fijian Cabinet, the attorney-general is appointed by the president on the advice of the prime minister. 

According to the 2013 Constitution of Fiji, the attorney-general is required to be a registered legal practitioner in Fiji, with not less than fifteen years' post-admission legal practice, either in Fiji or internationally. The attorney-general is a member of the Cabinet of Fiji, and is normally expected to be a Member of Parliament. The Prime Minister may, however, choose an attorney-general from outside Parliament after determining there is no suitably qualified Member of Parliament who supports the Government. An Attorney-General who is not a Member of Parliament may sit in Parliament, but may not vote.

The office of the attorney-general is the oldest surviving executive office in Fiji, having been established in the Kingdom of Fiji in 1872. It continued throughout Fiji's years as a British crown colony (1874–1970) and subsequently as the Dominion of Fiji (1970–1987) and republic (1987–present), with minimal modifications.

The attorney-general was the only Cabinet office, apart from that of the prime minister, specifically established by the 1997 Constitution, which required the attorney-general to be a member of either the House of Representatives or the Senate. A unique feature of the office was that except for voting rights (which could be exercised only in the chamber of which the attorney-general was officially a member), the attorney-general had the authority to participate in the business of both chambers of Parliament. This feature became redundant upon the adoption of the 2013 Constitution, which established a unicameral parliament.

Role of the Attorney-General's Office 
The role of the attorney-general is defined as "providing essential legal expertise and support to the Government". More specific functions include "legislative drafting", "legal aid", "the prerogative of mercy" (advising the President), "liquor licensing" and "film censorship". Thus, the attorney-general is responsible for all legal needs of government departments, statutory bodies, and state-owned enterprises. 

The office has three offices in Suva, Lautoka, and Labasa respectively. Government legal work in the country's Central and Eastern Divisions is undertaken by the central office in Suva, headed by the Solicitor-General, while the Lautoka office (headed by the Principal Legal Officer) is responsible for the Western Division. The Northern Division is covered by the Labasa office.

List of attorneys-general of Fiji 
Note that some attorneys-general have held office in multiple consecutive administrations, particularly in the colonial era.

Kingdom of Viti (1871–1874)

Crown colony (1874–1970)

Dominion (1970–1987)

Republic (1987–present)

See also 
 Cabinet of Fiji

References

External links 
Website of the Office of the Attorney-General of Fiji

Cabinet of Fiji
Government of Fiji
 
1872 establishments in Fiji